Xinlitun,or Hsin-li-t’un, is a town within Heishan County in Jinzhou prefecture, Liaoning, China. It's in the north east of the prefecture about 100 km west of Shenyang city.

During the Chinese Civil war, Xinlitun and other peripheral towns of Shenyang were captured under command of Lin Biao in January 1948.

References 

Towns in Liaoning
Jinzhou